Bordj Bou Naâma is a district in Tissemsilt Province, Algeria. It was named after its capital, Bordj Bounaama.

Municipalities
The district is further divided into 4 municipalities:
Bordj Bounaama
Sidi Slimane 
Béni Chaïb
Béni Lahncène

Districts of Tissemsilt Province